Mehriz (also Romanized as Mehrīz) is a city in the Central District of Mehriz County, Yazd province, Iran, and serves as capital of the county. At the 2006 census, its population was 26,364 in 6,954 households. The following census in 2011 counted 28,483 people in 8,149 households. The latest census in 2016 showed a population of 34,237 people in 10,344 households.

Gallery

References 

Mehriz County

Cities in Yazd Province

Populated places in Yazd Province

Populated places in Mehriz County